Jacques Audiard (born 30 April 1952) is a French film director, producer, and screenwriter. He is the son of Michel Audiard, also a film director and screenwriter.

He has won both the César Award for Best Film and the BAFTA Award for Best Film Not in the English Language twice, in 2005 for The Beat That My Heart Skipped and in 2010 for A Prophet, as well as winning the Grand Prix at the Cannes Film Festival. 

His 2012 film Rust and Bone, competed for the Palme d'Or at the 2012 Cannes Film Festival, was nominated for the BAFTA Award for Best Film Not in the English Language and the Golden Globe Award for Best Foreign Language Film, and won the BFI London Film Festival Award for Best Film.

His 2015 film Dheepan won the Palme d'Or at the 2015 Cannes Film Festival.

Life and career
Audiard was born in Paris. He began his screenwriting career in the 1980s with films including Réveillon chez Bob!, Mortelle randonnée, Baxter, Fréquence Meurtre, and Saxo.

In 1994, he directed See How They Fall (French: Regarde les hommes tomber), a road movie starring Mathieu Kassovitz and Jean-Louis Trintignant. The film won the César Award for best first film and the Prix Georges-Sadoul. Two years later he reunited with Kassovitz and Trintignant for Un Héros Très Discret – A Self-Made Hero in English, adapted from the novel by Jean-François Deniau.

In 1996, A Self-Made Hero won the  Best Screenplay Award at Cannes and received six César Awards nominations. In 2002, Read My Lips was nominated for nine Césars and won three, for Best Actress (Emmanuelle Devos), Best Screenplay and Best Sound.

His fourth movie, De Battre Mon Cœur s'est Arrêté, received 10 nominations at the Césars and won eight, among them the Césars for Best Film, Best Director, Best Screenplay, Best Film Music and Best Cinematography.

In 2009, A Prophet won the Grand Prix at Cannes and the BAFTA award for Best Film Not in the English Language, and was nominated for 13 César Awards, winning nine: Best Film, Best Director, Best Actor and Most Promising Actor for Tahar Rahim, Best Supporting Actor for Niels Arestrup, Best Original Screenplay, Best Cinematography, Best Editing and Best Production Design.

In 2013, Rust and Bone received two BAFTA nominations, two Golden Globe nominations and nine César nominations (including Best Actress for Marion Cotillard), winning four: Best Adapted Screenplay, Most Promising Actor for Matthias Schoenaerts, Best Original Music for Alexandre Desplat and Best Editing for Juliette Welfling.

In 2015, his seventh movie, Dheepan won the Palme d'Or at Cannes and received nine César nominations.

He has released some music videos, among them Comme Elle Vient by Noir Désir in which all the actors were deaf-mute and interpreted the lyrics of the song in sign language. The beginning of the feature (a sequence with subtitles) created a minor scandal; it displayed three women discussing politics who come to the conclusion that "it is better to be deaf than to listen to that".

On 2 September 2018, his first American film The Sisters Brothers had its world premiere at the Venice Film Festival.

Filmography

Other awards

Stockholm International Film Festival - Stockholm Visionary Award
Valladolid International Film Festival - Espiga de Honor

References

External links

Clipography
Jacques Audiard Interview

1952 births
Living people
Best Director César Award winners
Best Director Lumières Award winners
César Award winners
Directors of Palme d'Or winners
Filmmakers who won the Best Foreign Language Film BAFTA Award
Venice Best Director Silver Lion winners
French male film actors
French film directors
French male screenwriters
French screenwriters
Male actors from Paris
French-language film directors
Cannes Film Festival Award for Best Screenplay winners